John Watters (12 November 1884 – 20 February 1961) was a British gymnast. He competed in the men's artistic individual all-around event at the 1908 Summer Olympics.

References

1884 births
1961 deaths
British male artistic gymnasts
Olympic gymnasts of Great Britain
Gymnasts at the 1908 Summer Olympics
Place of birth missing